Röthelstein is an Austrian river icebreaker owned by Verbund AG. She is used to break ice and push barges on the Danube river. Built by Kværner Masa-Yards in Finland in 1995, she was the first new vessel to be fitted with Azipod propulsion units.

History 

In early 1994, Kværner Masa-Yards signed a contract worth about $4.3 million for the construction of a shallow-draft river icebreaker for the Austrian power company Österreichische Donaukraftwerke AG (today Verbund AG). The vessel would be fitted with a new type of propulsion system and, following extensive development work carried out by the shipyard's Arctic Research Centre, feature high icebreaking capability despite its small size and shallow draft. Instead of being launched from a slipway or floated out from a dry dock, the 400-ton vessel was lowered to the water using the shipyard's cranes in late 1994. She was given the name Röthelstein after a municipality of the same name.

This was one of the first demonstrations of the double acting ship principle.

After the trials, Röthelstein sailed through the Rhine–Main–Danube Canal flying the Finnish flag. She was delivered to the owner in the port of Ybbs an der Donau in April 1995. Since then, Röthelstein has been in service on the Danube River.

Design 

The hull form follows the design of very shallow draft river icebreakers with a wide cylindrical bow similar to those found in landing crafts.

Röthelstein has a diesel-electric propulsion system consisting of two Caterpillar 3508 DITA generating sets, each producing 700kW, and two 560kW ABB Azipod VI0760A propulsion units with stainless steel propellers. Following retrofits to two existing vessels, the newly built Röthelstein was only the third vessel ever to be fitted with an electric podded propulsion system where the propulsion motors driving the propellers are located inside steerable gondolas. She was also the first vessel with Azipod units in pulling configuration where the propellers are facing forwards to improve efficiency and icebreaking performance.

References 

Icebreakers of Austria
1994 ships
Ships built in Helsinki
Ships of Austria